Glenea celia is a species of beetle in the family Cerambycidae. It was described by Francis Polkinghorne Pascoe in 1888. It is known from Sumatra, Java, Borneo and Malaysia. It contains the varietas Glenea celia var. bipuncticollis.

References

celia
Beetles described in 1888